In Greek mythology, Othreis (Ancient Greek: Οθρηις Othrêis means "of Mount Othrys") was an oread nymph who consorted with both Zeus and Apollo and became by them mother of Meliteus and Phager respectively.

Mythology 
When Meliteus was born, Othreis, in fear of Hera's wrath, exposed the child. The boy, however, was nurtured by bees and thus survived. He was soon found by his half-brother Phager, who was pasturing his sheep in the neighborhood. Impressed with the child being nurtured in such a marvelous way, as well as having reckoned a prophecy that told him to take care of his relative nourished by bees, Phager adopted and raised Meliteus. When Meliteus grew up, he founded the city Melite in Phthia.

Note

Oreads
Nymphs
Divine women of Zeus
Women of Apollo

Reference 
 Antoninus Liberalis, The Metamorphoses of Antoninus Liberalis translated by Francis Celoria (Routledge 1992). Online version at the Topos Text Project.